Some Lonesome Night is a song by George W. Meyer with lyrics by Grant Clarke and George Whiting.  It was published in 1918 by Leo Feist Inc.

References 

Bibliography
Crew, Danny O. Presidential Sheet Music: An Illustrated Catalogue of Published Music Associated with the American Presidency and Those Who Sought the Office. Jefferson, North Carolina: McFarland, 2001.  
Jasen, David A. Tin Pan Alley: The Composers, the Songs, the Performers, and Their Times : the Golden Age of American Popular Music from 1886 to 1956. New York: D.I. Fine, 1988. . 
Paas, John Roger. America Sings of War: American Sheet Music from World War I. Wiesbaden: Harrassowitz Vertag, 2014.  
Parker, Bernard S. World War I Sheet Music: 9,670 Patriotic Songs Published in the United States, 1914-1920, with More Than 600 Covers Illustrated. Jefferson, N.C.: McFarland, 2007.  

Songs about nights
Songs about loneliness
1918 songs
Songs of World War I
Songs written by George W. Meyer
Songs with lyrics by George A. Whiting